Nemeris is a genus of moths in the family Geometridae described by Rindge in 1981.

Species
Nemeris speciosa (Hulst, 1896)
Nemeris percne Rindge, 1981
Nemeris sternitzkyi Rindge, 1981

References

Ourapterygini